Dafydd Bach ap Madog Wladaidd, also known as Sypyn Cyfeiliog (fl. 1340–1390), was a Welsh-language poet.  Dafydd composed love poems and poems in praise of nobility. His most famous poem is Croeso mewn Llys ("A Welcome in a Court"), composed in honour of a welcome he received.

References
R. Iestyn Daniel (ed.), Gwaith Dafydd Bach ap Madog Wladaidd 'Sypyn Cyfeiliog' a Llywelyn ab y Moel (University of Wales Centre for Advanced Welsh and Celtic Studies, 1998)

See also

Sypyn Cyfeiliog at Wikisource

Welsh-language poets
14th-century Welsh poets